Kalyvia Thorikou is a town and a former municipality in East Attica, Greece. Since the 2011 local government reform it is part of the municipality Saronikos, of which it is the seat and a municipal unit. The municipal unit has an area of 70.636 km2. The town has historically been an Arvanite settlement.

Geography

Kalyvia Thorikou consists of two distinct parts: the main inland town Kalyvia and the coastal settlement, which is also referred to as Lagonisi. Kalyvia proper is situated on the south side of the Mesogaia plain, in the southeastern part of the Attica peninsula. There are several low mountains around Kalyvia Thorikou, including  to its south and Merenta to its northeast. Kalyvia Thorikou is 7 km northeast from the Saronic Gulf coast at Lagonisi, 5 km south of Markopoulo Mesogaias, 6 km northwest of Keratea and 24 km southeast of Athens city centre. The Greek National Road 89 (Gerakas - Koropi - Lavrio - Sounio) passes east of the town.

Notable people 
Athena Manoukian, singer

Sister Cities
 Garons
 Mesa Geitonia
 Villa Castelli

See also
List of municipalities of Attica

References

External links
Official website 
Greek Travel Pages
news

Populated places in East Attica
Arvanite settlements